Rhodium hexafluoride, also rhodium(VI) fluoride, (RhF6) is the inorganic compound of rhodium and fluorine.  A black volatile solid, it is a highly reactive material, and a rare example of a rhodium(VI) compound. It is one of seventeen known binary hexafluorides.

Synthesis, structure, properties
Rhodium hexafluoride is prepared by reaction of rhodium metal with an excess of elemental fluorine:

Rh + 3 F2   →   RhF6

The RhF6 molecule has octahedral molecular geometry. Consistent with its d3 configuration, the six Rh–F bond lengths are equivalent, being 1.824 Å. It crystallises in an orthorhombic space group Pnma with lattice parameters of a = 9.323 Å, b = 8.474 Å, and c = 4.910 Å.

Like some other metal fluorides, RhF6 is highly oxidizing. It attacks glass, and can even react with elemental oxygen.

References

Further reading 
 Gmelins Handbuch der anorganischen Chemie, System Nr. 63, Rhodium, Part B1, pp. 266–268.

External links 
 Rhodium hexafluoride at webelements.com.

Rhodium compounds
Hexafluorides
Octahedral compounds
Platinum group halides